Abdul-Aziz Atta (1 April 1920 – 12 June 1972) was a Nigerian administrator. He was the son of Alhaji Ibrahim Atta, Atta of Igbirra, a traditional ruler in Kogi State.

Early life 
Abdul-Aziz Atta was born on 1 April 1920 in Lokoja. His father was Alhaji Ibrahim Atta, Atta of Igbirra, a traditional ruler in Kogi State.

Education 
He was educated at Okene Elementary and Middle Schools between 1926 and 1935. In 1936 he entered Achimota College, Ghana, and studied there until 1944 when he went to Balliol College, Oxford, England, graduating in 1947 in Philosophy, Politics and Economics.

Career 
Atta returned to Nigeria in 1948 and joined the government service as Cadet Administrative Officer in the then Unified Nigeria Public Service. He served in Calabar, Opobo, Ikot-Ekpene and former Southern Cameroons, all then under the Eastern Region. He continued to serve in the Eastern Region even after the division of the Public Service. He was District Officer in Umuahia before becoming the Private Secretary of Dr. Nnamdi Azikwe, Premier of the Eastern region. Thereafter, he was Secretary to the Agent-General for the Region in Britain; Training Officer in the Regional Ministry of Finance, Enugu; and Secretary for Anang Province. He moved to the Federal Public Service as Administrative Officer, Class II, in 1958 and was promoted to Permanent Secretary in 1960, and headed in turn the Ministry of Defence, Ministry of Communications, Ministry of Industries and Ministry of Finance. He occupied the important post of  Permanent Secretary, Finance, from 1966 through the years of civil war with all its effect on the country's economy. In December 1970, he was appointed Administrative Officer (Principal Grade) and became Secretary to the Federal Military Government and Head of the Federal Civil Service.

Death 
Atta died on 12 June 1972 at the Royal Free Hospital, London, after two years in the highest administrative post in Nigeria, and was buried in Lokoja.

Personal life 
He had four daughters and a son by his wife Iyabo Atta. One of his brothers, Alhaji Abdul Maliki Atta was Nigeria's first High Commissioner to the United Kingdom.  He belongs to the same ruling family as Prince Attah Abdulmalik Danjuma of Okene in Kogi state.

References 

1920 births
1972 deaths
Nigerian civil servants
Alumni of Achimota School
People from Kogi State
Nigerian expatriates in the United Kingdom
Alumni of Balliol College, Oxford